The following is the list of firsts in the Philippines.

In order to be listed, each feat must be backed up by a third-party reliable source explicitly stating that the feat is the first. Corporate milestones, such as the first branch or property of a particular company in the Philippines, are excluded, unless it is also a first in its industry.

Architecture and Engineering
The following are the first buildings or structures of their type.

Religious buildings
First mosque: Masjid Sheikh Makhdum in Simunul, Tawi-Tawi – 1380
First Catholic church: Basilica del Santo Niño – 1735
First synagogue: Temple Emil in Taft Avenue, Malate, Manila – 1922
First steel building church: San Sebastian Church – 1888

Hotels and restaurants
First luxury hotel: Hotel del Oriente – 1889

Building certifications
First LEED Platinum certified building: Zuellig Building – awarded in 2013

Education buildings
First 24-hour public library building: Cebu City Public Library – started their operations in 2018

Transportation buildings
First elevated railway stations: LRT Line 1 stations from Baclaran Station to United Nations Station in Pasay City and Manila – December 1, 1984
First depressed railway station: Buendia Station of the MRT Line 3 in Makati City – December 15, 1999
First underground railway station: Katipunan Station of the LRT Line 2 in Quezon City – April 5, 2003
First landport: Parañaque Integrated Terminal Exchange in Parañaque City – November 5, 2018

Roads and bridges
First steel bridge: Ayala Bridge in Manila – 1908
First toll road: North Luzon Expressway from Balintawak, Quezon City to Guiguinto, Bulacan – August 4, 1968. Formerly known as North Diversion Road.
First double-decked highway: the Metro Manila Skyway Stage 3 – January 14, 2021
First grade-separated highway: the Metro Manila Skyway Stage 1 – December 10, 1998
First bike lane network: Marikina Bikeways Project in Marikina City – July 22, 2001
First protected bike lane along a national highway: at the Laguna Lake Highway in Taguig City – February 7, 2019
First traffic light intersection: Plaza Goiti (Plaza Lacson) in Manila – 1920s
First wire-cable suspension bridge: Puente Colgante Bridge in Manila – constructed in 1852 and replaced by the Quezon Bridge in 1939

Other
First installed elevator: at the Burke Building
First installed air conditioning system in an office: at the Quezon Executive Office in Malacañang Palace – under the supervision of Mr. A.D. Williams on May 27, 1936
First installed air conditioning system in a public structure: at the Crystal Arcade in Escolta, Manila – building built in 1932
First installed air conditioning system in a hotel: at the Manila Hotel in along Manila Bay – building built on July 4, 1912
First installed air conditioning system in a mall: at the Ali Mall in Cubao, Quezon City – building opened to the public on June 30, 1976
 First installed intercom system in a public structure: at the Manila Hotel in along Manila Bay – building built on July 4, 1912
First luxury box: Premier Suites at the Mall of Asia Arena

Beauty pageants

Big Four pageants
First Filipino Miss World: Megan Young (2013)
First Filipino Miss Universe: Gloria Diaz (1969)
First Filipino Miss International: Gemma Cruz (1964)
First Filipino Miss Earth: Karla Henry (2008)
First Filipino to represent the country more than two Big Four pageant competitions (official):
Carlene Aguilar (Miss Earth 2001 and Miss World 2005)
Catriona Gray (Miss World 2016 and Miss Universe 2018)
Celeste Cortesi (Miss Earth 2018 and Miss Universe 2022)
First consecutive titles in Miss Earth: Jamie Herrell (2014) and Angelia Ong (2015)
First Miss Universe hosted: 1974 in Manila
First Miss Earth hosted: 2001 in Manila

Other pageants
First Filipino Miss International Queen: Kevin Balot (2012)
First Filipino Miss Supranational: Mutya Johanna Datul (2013)
First Filipino Miss Heritage: Odessa Mae Tadaya (2014)
First Filipino Miss Globe: Ann Lorraine Colis (2015)
First Filipino Miss Scuba International: Cindy Pacia Madduma (2015)
First Filipino Miss United Continents: Jeslyn Santos (2016)
First Filipino Mrs. Grandma Universe: Agnes Jakosalem (2017)
First Filipino Reina Hispanoamericana: Teresita Marquez (2017)
First Filipino Miss Multinational: Sophia Senoron (2017)
First Filipino Miss Eco International: Cynthia Thomalla (2018)
First Filipino Miss Summer World: Kaycee Coleen Lim (2018)
First Filipino Miss Landscape International: Karen Grace Atienza (2018)
First Filipino Miss Tourism Worldwide: Zara Carbonell (2018)
First Filipino Miss Intercontinental: Karen Gallman (2018)
First Filipino Miss Tourism World Intercontinental: Francesca Taruc (2019)
First Filipino Noble Queen of the Universe: Patricia Javier (2019)
First Filipino Miss Trans Global: Mela Franco Habijan (2020)
First Filipino Miss Eco Teen International: Roberta Tamondong (2020)
First Filipino Miss Aura International: Alexandra Faith Garcia (2021)
First Filipino Miss Culture International: Samela Aubrey Godin (2021)
First Filipino Miss Interglobal: Miriam Damoah (2021)
First Filipino Miss Summit International: Nica Zosa (2022)
First Filipino Reina Internacional del Cacao: Jerelleen Rodriguez (2022)
First Filipino Miss Global: Shane Tormes (2022)
First Filipino Manhunt International: June Macasaet (2012)
First Filipino Mister International: Neil Perez (2014)
First Filipino Mr Gay World: John Raspado (2017)
First consecutive titles in Miss Asia Pacific International: Maria del Carmen Ines Zaragoza (1982) and Bong Dimayacyac (1983)
First consecutive titles in Miss Tourism International: Rizzini Alexis Gomez (2012) and Angeli Dione Gomez (2013)
First consecutive titles in Mr Gay World: John Jeffrey Carlos (2019), Leonard Kodie Macayan (2020) and Joel Rey Carcasona (2021)
First Mister International hosted: 2015 in Manila
First Miss Intercontinental hosted: 2019 in Manila
First Mister World hosted: 2019 in Manila

National-level pageants
First Miss Philippines: Anita Noble (1926)
First Miss World Philippines: Vivien Lee Austria (1966)
First Filipino Miss Universe Philippines:
Myrna Panlilio (1964) (Binibining Pilipinas)
Rabiya Mateo (2020) (Miss Universe Philippines Organization)
First openly bisexual woman Miss Universe Philippines: Beatrice Gomez (2021)
First Miss International Philippines: Edita Vital (1960)
First Miss Philippines Earth: Carlene Aguilar (2001)

Others
First Filipino to represent the country in the Miss Universe pageant: Teresita Sanchez (1952)
First Filipino semifinalist at the Miss Universe pageant: Blesilda Ocampo (1954)
First Filipino to be a runner-up in the Miss Universe pageant: Blesilda Mueler Ocampo (1954)
First Filipino to place in the Miss World pageant: Pinky Amabuyok (1968)
First Filipino to win Best in National Costume award in the Miss Universe pageant: Charlene Gonzales (1994)
First Filipino to win Best in Miss Photogenic award in the Miss Universe pageant: Vida Valentina Doria (1971)
First Mutya ng Pilipinas winner: Jane Mozo de Joya (1968)
First Filipino to place in the Miss Universe pageant from the 21st Century: Venus Raj (2010)
First Filipina Muslim to win Miss Asia Pacific International: Sharifa Akeel (2018)
First Binibining Pilipinas candidate who joined the National Pageant twice: Elvira Gonzales (1964 and 1965)
First Filipino to represent the country in the Miss Grand International pageant: Ali Forbes (2013)
First Filipino to represent the country in the Miss Supranational pageant: Lourenz Grace Remetillo (2011)
First Binibining Pilipinas winner to be dethroned: Anjanette Abayari (1991)
First Filipino to place in the Miss Intercontinental pageant: Maria Sovietskaya Bacud (1995)
First Filipino to place in the Mr. World pageant: Andrew Wolff (2012)
First Filipino to place in the Miss Earth pageant: Cathy Untalan (2006)
First Filipino and Miss World contestant ever to win the Miss Talent award: Louvette Monzon Hammond (1978)
First Filipino to place in the Miss Supranational pageant: Elaine Kay Moll (2012)
First Filipino semifinalist at the Miss International pageant: Edita Vital (1960)
First Filipino to use interpreter at the Miss Universe pageant: Maxine Medina (2016)
First Filipino to win the Asia's Next Top Model: Maureen Wroblewitz (2017)
First Filipino to walk in the Victoria's Secret Fashion Show and to appear in the pages of the Sports Illustrated Swimsuit Issue: Kelsey Merritt (2018 and 2019)
First consecutive titles in Miss Millennial Philippines: Shaila Mae Rebortera (2018) and Nicole Yance Borromeo (2019)

Education
First Filipino Superintendent of schools: Camilo Osías – 1915

Energy
First nuclear power plant: Bataan Nuclear Power Plant

Exploration
First Filipino to reach the peak of Mount Everest: Leo Oracion – May 17, 2006
First Filipino to reach the peak of Seven Summits: Romi Garduce – January 6, 2012
First Filipina to reach the peak of Seven Summits: Carina Dayondon – December 16, 2018
First Filipino to reach the North Pole: Ramon Ilusorio – 1996
First Filipino to across Pacific Ocean: Florentino Das – May 14, 1955
First Filipino to reach the 3rd deepest spot on Earth: Deo Florence Onda – March 23, 2021

Government and politics

President

Vice–President
First Vice–President: Sergio Osmeña – 1935
First Female Vice–President: Gloria Macapagal Arroyo – 1998

Senate
First Senate President: Manuel L. Quezon – 1916
First Female Senator: Geronima Pecson – 1947
First Muslim Senator: Hadji Butu – 1916
First Female senator to be re-elected: Eva Estrada Kalaw – 1965
First actor to become senator: Rogelio de la Rosa – 1957

House of Representatives
First House Speaker: Sergio Osmeña – 1907
First Female Representative: Elisa Rosales-Ochoa – 1941
First openly transgender woman representative: Geraldine Roman – 2016
First Female House Speaker: Gloria Macapagal Arroyo – 2018

Supreme Court
First Chief Justice: Cayetano Arellano – 1901–1920
First Chief Justice to be impeached: Renato Corona – 2011
First Female Chief Justice: 
Maria Lourdes Sereno – 2012–2018 (de facto; tenure nullified through Quo warranto petition)
Teresita de Castro – 2018 (de jure)
First Female Associate Justice: Cecilia Muñoz-Palma – 1973

Cabinet
First Female Social Welfare Secretary: Asuncion A. Perez – 1948
First Muslim Justice Secretary: Simeon Datumanong – 2003

Others
First Presidential and Vice–Presidential elections: 1935
First Senate elections: 1916
First Elections for House of Representatives: 1898
First State of the Nation Address: Delivered by Manuel L. Quezon at the Legislative Building on November 25, 1935
First Filipina judge of the International Criminal Court: Miriam Defensor Santiago – December 12, 2011
First Nobel Prize laureate: Maria Ressa – 2021 Nobel Peace Prize

History
First Filipino marriage to a foreigner: Nicolasa de Alvarez, a native Filipino to Pablo Alvarez, a Spaniard – 1585
First scientific map of the Philippines: Murillo Velarde map – 1734
First Filipina to lead an uprising against a foreign power: Gabriela Silang – 1763
First Filipino documented serial killer: Juan Severino Mallari – 1816–1826
First waterworks system in the Philippines: Carriedo – July 24, 1882
First Filipino novel: Nínay – authored by Pedro Paterno and published in 1885
First President of Katipunan: Deodato Arellano – elected in October 1892
First ice cream store in the Philippines: Clarke's Ice Cream Parlor – 1899
First automobile in the Philippines: Richard-Brasier roadster car – imported in 1904
First labor union in the Philippines: Unión Obrera Democrática Filipina – established on February 2, 1902 
First aircraft to fly in the Philippines: Shriver's Skylark biplane of James "Bud" Mars – February 21, 1911
First labor day in the Philippines: throughout the establishment of Congreso Obrero de Filipinas on May 1, 1913
First female chief nurse and superintendent of the Philippine General Hospital: Anastacia Giron-Tupas – 1917
First Balagtasan in the Philippines: took place at Instituto de Mujeres in Manila on April 6, 1924
First comic strip in the Philippines: Kenkoy – published on January 11, 1929
First Filipina to be featured on the Philippine peso: Tandang Sora – appeared on ₱100 banknote from the English series from 1951 to 1966
First US president to visit Manila: Dwight D. Eisenhower – June 14, 1960
First national celebration of Philippine Independence Day on June 12: 1962
First chop-chop lady in Philippine history: Lucila Lalu – her mutilated body was discovered in the parts of Metro Manila on May 28, 1967
First National Artist of the Philippines: Fernando Amorsolo – posthumously awarded on April 27, 1972
First female commercial pilot: Aimee Carandang – 1993
First Aeta lawyer in Philippine history: Wayda Cosme – 2001
First recipient of Certificate of Ancestral Domain Title: awarded in February 2002 to the towns of Bago and Kankanaey in Bakun, Benguet
First Philippine variety show to be franchised in another country: Eat Bulaga! – throughout Eat Bulaga! Indonesia which was aired on July 16, 2012
First female Quezon Service Cross recipient: Miriam Defensor Santiago – posthumously awarded on December 3, 2018
First Filipino Lorenzo il Magnifico Award recipient: Michael Villagante – awarded on October 31, 2021
First female editor-in-chief of Vogue Philippines: Bea Valdes – appointed on April 26, 2022
First Philippine program to launch non-fungible tokens (NFTs) or digital trading cards: Idol Philippines – throughout a partnership with Theta Network which was launched on August 12, 2022
First Filipino to travel to all the countries in the world (recognized by the United Nations): Odette Aquitania Ricasa – August 25, 2022

Military

First supersonic aircraft: Northrop F-5 – first unit acquired in 1965 (also first in Southeast Asia)
First AFP Chief: Artemio Ricarte – appointed on March 22, 1897
First female Battalion Commander: Ramona Palabrica-Go – appointed in January 2003
First female Fighter Pilot: Jul Laiza Mae Camposano-Beran – introduced on March 31, 2022

Performing arts

Film
First films screened: Un Homme Au Chapeau (Man with a Hat), Une scene de danse Japonaise (Scene from a Japanese Dance), Les Boxers (The Boxers), and La Place de L’ Opera (The Place L’ Opera) at the Salon de Pertierra in Escolta, Manila – January 1, 1897
First films shot: Panorama de Manila (Manila landscape), Fiesta de Quiapo (Quiapo Fiesta), Puwente de España (Bridge of Spain), and Esceñas Callejeras (Street scenes) by Antonio Ramos (also first Filipino motion picture producer) – 1898
First hall exclusively for film viewing: Cine Walgrah at No. 60 Calle Santa Rosa in Intramuros, Manila – 1900
First Filipino-owned movie theater: Cinematograpo Rizal established by Jose Jimenez along Azcarraga street in Manila – 1903
First film produced in the Philippines: La vida de Jose Rizal by Rizalina Photoplay Company and directed by Edward Gross, an American – August 23, 1912
First film produced in the Philippines by Filipinos: Dalagang Bukid – September 19, 1919
First kissing scene in Philippine cinema: Luis Tuason and Isabel "Dimples" Cooper in the film Ang Tatlong Hambog – 1926
First Filipino horror movie: Ang Manananggal – 1927
First all-talking, completely sound Filipino film: Punyal na Ginto – March 9, 1933
First Filipino film to have gained international recognition: Zamboanga – 1937
First Filipino female feature film director: Carmen Concha – 1939
First Filipino movie with colored sequences: Ibong Adarna – 1941
First Filipino movie in full-color: Prinsipe Amante – 1951
first Filipino movie to be acclaimed in an international film festival: Genghis Khan – showed on the Venice Film Festival in 1952
First Filipino full-length animation film: Adarna – 1997
First Filipino short film to win Best Short Film Award in Cannes Film Festival: Anino by Raymond Red – May 25, 2000
First Filipino film director to win Best Director Award in Cannes Film Festival: Brillante Mendoza – May 23, 2009
First Filipino Actress to win Best Actress Award in Cannes Film Festival: Jaclyn Jose – May 22, 2016
First Filipino Actress with 2 movies that reached ₱800 million mark: Kathryn Bernardo (The Hows of Us and Hello, Love, Goodbye) – 2018 and 2019
First animated Netflix film from the Philippines: Hayop Ka!: The Nimfa Dimaano Story – October 29, 2020
First Filipino Actor to win Best Actor Award in Asian Academy Creative Awards: Arjo Atayde – December 4, 2020
First Filipino Actor to win Best Actor Award in Venice Film Festival: John Arcilla – September 11, 2021
First Filipino Actress to win Outstanding Asian Star in Seoul International Drama Awards: Belle Mariano – September 5, 2022

Music
 First Philippine opera in the Tagalog language: Sangdugong Panaguinip composed by Ladislao Bonus – premiere on August 2, 1902, at the Zorrilla Theater in Manila.
 First Filipino international opera singer: Jovita Fuentes (Madama Butterfly) – 1925
 First Filipino boy band act to land a spot on the US Billboard Top 100 Chart: The Rocky Fellers – 1963
 First Filipino solo recording artist to chart in the US, as her debut single "If You Leave Me Now" peaked at 44 at the Billboard Hot 100 chart: Jaya – 1989
 First Filipino to win a Tony Award: Lea Salonga for Best Actress in a Musical (Miss Saigon) – June 2, 1991
 First Filipino and Asian solo singer to land in the Top 10 at the US Billboard 200, as  her studio album Charice peaked at number 8. Charice – 2010
 First Filipino group to be nominated in the Billboard Music Awards: SB19 – 2021
First Filipino act and P-pop artist featured on the Recording Academy Grammy's Global Spin live series. SB19's Felip/Ken – 2022

Publications
First daily newspaper: The Philippines Herald

Religion
First Filipino Christians: Rajah Humabon, Rajah Kolambu, and 400 other Filipino – April 14, 1521
First Religious Order in the Philippines: Franciscans – 1577
First Filipino Priest: Martin Lakandula – 1590
First Catholic printed book in the Philippines: Doctrina Christiana – 1593
First Filipino Catholic cardinal: Rufino Santos – by Pope John XXIII in 1960
First Filipino Catholic bishop: Jorge Barlin – 1905
First Filipino Catholic saint: Lorenzo Ruiz – canonized by Pope John Paul II on October 18, 1987
First Filipino Master of the Order of Preachers: Gerard Timoner III – elected on July 13, 2019
First Filipino Pontifical Swiss Guard: Sebastian Esai Eco Eviota – joined on January 22, 2022
First Filipino Superior General of the De La Salle Brothers: Armin Luistro – elected on May 18, 2022
First Marian international shrine in the Philippines: Antipolo Cathedral – declared on June 18, 2022
First Catholic Holy Mass: Site of event disputed – 1521
Easter Mass in Limasawa – officially recognized by the government through Republic Act No. 2733
Other proposed sites of the event by historians includes Masao, or Mazaua in Butuan, and Magallanes in Agusan del Norte
First Papal visit in the Philippines: Pope Paul VI from November 27–29, 1970 in Manila
First National Eucharistic Congress of the Philippines hosted: 1929 in Manila
First Eucharistic congress hosted: 1937 in Manila
First National Youth Day of the Philippines hosted: 1986 in Manila
First World Youth Day hosted: 1995 in Manila
First World Meeting of Families hosted: 2003 in Manila
First Asian Youth Day hosted: 2009 in Cavite

Science and technology

Communications
First internet connection: March 29, 1994
First Philippine-based bulletin board system: First-Fil RBBS – went online August 1986
First 5G video call made: February 21, 2020 – by representatives of local firm Globe Telecom and AIS Thailand lasting more than three minutes

Electric transportation
First hybrid electric train: DOST Hybrid Electric Train (HET) – April 24, 2019

Medical science
First kidney transplant: Rainier Lagman by a 12-man medical team led by Dr. Jorge Garcia at the Makati Medical Center – May 28, 1994
First pediatric liver transplant: Erica Buenaventura, a three-year-old, by an 11-member surgical team led by Dr. Vanessa De Villa at The Medical City Ortigas – January 7, 2011

Nuclear physics
First nuclear reactor: Philippine Research Reactor-1 – first criticality in 1963

Space science
First satellites:
First satellite owned by a Filipino entity: Agila 1/Mabuhay – acquired as Palapa B2-P by Mabuhay Satellite Corporation from PT Pasifik Satelit Nusantara in 1996
First Filipino satellite launched to space: Agila 2 – launched in 1997
First satellite designed and built by Filipinos / microsatellite: Diwata-1 – launched and deployed in 2016
First Filipino cube satellite launched to space: Maya-1 – launched and deployed in 2018
First asteroids named after a Filipino: 6282 Edwelda – named after Edwin Aguirre and Imelda Joson in 1995
First minor planet named after a Filipino: 13241 Biyo – named after Dr. Josette Biyo in 1998
First Filipina mission operations manager of NASA: Angelita Castro-Kelly – appointed in 1990

Sports

Olympics
First competitor for the Philippines in the Olympics: David Nepomuceno (athletics) – 1924 Summer Olympics in Paris
First Filipino Olympic medalist: Teofilo Yldefonso (swimming) – Bronze; Men's 200 meter breaststroke at the 1928 Summer Olympics in Amsterdam
First Filipino Olympic gold medalist:
In a regular sport (official): Hidilyn Diaz (weightlifting) – Women's 55 kg at the 2020 Summer Olympics in Tokyo
In a demonstration sport: Arianne Cerdeña (bowling) – 1988 Summer Olympics in Seoul
In a mixed-NOC competition: Luis Gabriel Moreno (archery; with Li Jiaman of China) – Mixed team at the 2014 Youth Summer Olympics in Nanjing
First Filipino Olympic silver medalist: Anthony Villanueva (boxing) – Men's featherweight at the 1968 Summer Olympics in Tokyo
First female Filipino Olympic silver medalist (official):
Hidilyn Diaz (weightlifting) – Women's 53 kg weightlifting at the 2016 Summer Olympics in Rio de Janeiro
Nesthy Petecio (boxing) – Women's featherweight at the 2020 Summer Olympics in Tokyo
First Filipino Winter Olympians: Juan Cipriano and Ben Nanasca (alpine skiing) – 1972 Winter Olympics in Sapporo
First Filipino marathoner to qualify for the Olympics: Mary Joy Tabal (athletics) – 2016 Summer Olympics in Rio de Janeiro

By sports

Basketball
First Filipino basketball player to score a basket in the history of Philippine Basketball Association: Gregorio "Joy" Dionisio – April 9, 1975
First Filipino basketball team to win the All-Filipino title for 5 consecutive seasons in the history of Philippine Basketball Association: San Miguel Beermen – 2015–2019
First UAAP men's basketball tournament champion: UP Fighting Maroons – May 13, 2022
First Filipino World University Basketball Series champion: Ateneo Blue Eagles – August 11, 2022

Boxing
First Filipino to win World Flyweight Champion division title: Francisco "Pancho Villa" Guilledo – June 18, 1923
First Filipino to win 12 major world titles in eight weight divisions: Manny Pacquiao – 1998–2018

Chess
First Filipino chess Grandmaster: Eugene Torre – 1974
First Filipino Woman Grandmaster: Janelle Mae Frayna – September 2016
First Filipino to be inducted into the World Chess Hall of Fame: Eugene Torre – April 22, 2021

Cheerdance
First UAAP Cheerdance Competition champion: FEU Cheering Squad – May 22, 2022

Football
First official football game: Match at the opening of the Philippine Assembly – October 16, 1907
First football tournament: 1913 Far Eastern Championship Games (Also first in Asia)
First Filipino football team to qualify for the FIFA Women's World Cup: Philippines women's national football team – January 31, 2022
First Filipino football team to reach podium finish in the Southeast Asian Games: Philippines women's national football team – May 21, 2022
First Filipino AFF Women's Championship champion: Philippines women's national football team – July 17, 2022

Tennis
First Filipino juniors Grand Slam champion: Francis Alcantara – 2009 Australian Open – Boys' doubles in Melbourne, Australia
First Filipina juniors Grand Slam champion: Alexandra Eala – 2020 Australian Open – Girls' doubles in Melbourne, Australia
First Filipino juniors Grand Slam singles champion: Alexandra Eala – 2022 US Open – Girls' singles in New York City, United States

Volleyball
First UAAP women's volleyball champion: NU Lady Bulldogs – June 21, 2022
First Asian Women's Volleyball Cup hosted: 2022 in Manila

Others
First Filipino U.S. Open Nine-ball champion: Efren Reyes – 1994
First Filipino APF Asian Women's 9-Ball Open champion: Chezka Centeno – August 28, 2022
First Filipino North Pole Marathon finisher: Victor Consunji – April 2016
First Filipino Antarctic Ice Marathon finisher: Maggie Wilson – November 2017
First Filipino UCI Mountain Bike World Championships participant: Ariana Evangelista (cycle sports) – 2022 UCI Mountain Bike World Championships in Les Gets, France
First Filipino World Games medalist: Carlo Biado (billiards) – 2017 World Games in Wrocław, Poland
First Filipina World Games medalist: Junna Tsukii (karate) – 2022 World Games in Birmingham, United States
First Filipino Universiade gold medalist: Wesley So (chess) – 2013 Summer Universiade in Kazan, Russia
First Filipino JuJutsu World Championship gold medalist: Meggie Ochoa (jiu-jitsu) – 2018 JuJutsu World Championship in Malmö, Sweden
First Filipino Winter Universiade participant: Misha Fabian (figure skating) – 2019 Winter Universiade in Krasnoyarsk, Russia
First Filipino World Artistic Gymnastics Championships gold medalist: Carlos Yulo (gymnastics) – 2019 World Artistic Gymnastics Championships in Stuttgart, Germany
First Filipina NEC Karuizawa 72 champion: Yuka Saso (golf) – 2020 LPGA of Japan Tour in Kitasaku District, Nagano, Japan
First Filipina U.S. Women's Open champion: Yuka Saso (golf) – 2021 U.S. Women's Open in San Francisco, California, United States
First Filipino Spartan World Championships finisher: Elias Tabac – December 2021
First Filipino Junior World Championships qualifier: Sofia Frank (figure skating) – 2021 Santa Claus Cup in Budapest, Hungary
First Filipino to win all gold medals in the Southeast Asian Games: Carlos Yulo (gymnastics) – 2021 Southeast Asian Games in Hanoi, Vietnam
First Filipino World Athletics Championships medalist: EJ Obiena (pole vault) – 2021 World Athletics Championships in Eugene, Oregon
First Filipina Simone Asia Pacific Cup champion: Princess Mary Superal (golf) – 2022 Simone Asia Pacific Cup in Jakarta, Indonesia
First Filipino W Series participant: Bianca Bustamante (motorsport) – 2022 W Series in Barcelona, Spain
First Asian Games hosted: 1954 in Manila
First Southeast Asian Games hosted: 1981 in Manila
First full Twenty20 International match of the Philippine national cricket team: vs. Papua New Guinea, March 22, 2019 in Amini Park, Port Moresby (2018–19 ICC T20 World Cup East Asia-Pacific Qualifier – Regional Final)

See also
List of records of the Philippines

Notes

References

Philippines
Philippines-related lists of superlatives